Roller Derby Brasil (Team Brasil) represents Brazil in women's international roller derby, such as at the Roller Derby World Cup.

Team Brasil is composed of roller derby players from Brazil, who are selected in tryouts to compete at the national level. Team Brasil is incorporated as a not-for-profit organization, run by the Brazilian skaters.

First formed in 2011, Team Brasil first competed at the 2011 Roller Derby World Cup, held in Toronto, Canada. The team's skaters, who ordinarily compete using derby names, chose to use single names at the 2011 World Cup, following in the tradition of Brazilian players in many sports, most notably soccer, which is arguably the biggest sport in Brazil. The 2011 placed #11 of 12 teams. 
In the 2014 World Cup, Team Brasil qualified for the second round of the tournament and placed #14 of 30 teams.

Team roster

2018 roster 
Brazil announced its 2018 roster in January, 2018.

2017 roster
Brazil announced its 2017 team roster in October 2016.

2014 roster
Brazil announced its 2014 team roster in December 2013.

Coaches 2014

MVP 2014

The Most Valuable Player from Team Brasil at the second World Cup was Brazilian Nut, aka Nanda.

2011 roster
Brazil announced its initial team roster in August 2011. (league affiliations listed as of at the time of the announcement)

MVP 2011

The Most Valuable Player from team brasil at the first world cup was Brazilian Nut aka Nanda #16.

2011 World Cup
Team Brasil was one of thirteen countries to be represented at the inaugural Roller Derby World Cup, held in Toronto, Canada, in 2011. Team Brasil opened the tournament in the same group as Team Canada, Roller Derby France and Team Sweden and played 6 games overall during the weekend. In the group stage, each team played the others in their group once each. Team Brazil's first game was against Team Sweden, who won, 163–30, taking advantage of Team Brazil's relative inexperience. Gotham skater Brazilian Nut – competing as 'Fernanda' for the tournament – was the only skater for Brazil with WFTDA experience, and some skaters were playing their first public game ever.

In their second game, Brazil was dominated by the experience of Team Canada, who cruised to a relatively easy win, 408–7. In their third game of the group stage, Brazil lost to France, 212 to 28.

Team Brasil finished the group stage of the World Cup ranked eleventh, but then lost to Team France for the second time at the tournament, but by a far smaller margin than before, at 212 points to 138, in possibly their best game of the tournament. In the consolation stage, Team Brasil lost to both Team Ireland and Team Scotland, to finish the tournament in twelfth place.

2014 World Cup
Team Brasil was in Pool 2 which included Roller Derby Brasil, Roller Derby France, Team Portugal and Team Switzerland. France placed first in the pool, followed by (in order) Brazil, Portugal and Switzerland. After the pool round the top two teams from each pool were placed in a single elimination bracket. Roller Derby Brasil played Team Canada (roller derby) and was eliminated.

Scores

References

Brazil
Roller derby
Roller derby in Brazil
2011 establishments in Brazil
Sports clubs established in 2011